Parkwood is a southeastern suburb of Perth, the capital city of Western Australia. Its local government area is the City of Canning.

History
Parkwood was first settled by Henry Willett of Willett & Co, who was granted Canning Location 21 on the Canning River (which included nearby Lynwood) and settled in the area in June 1832. In November 1964, the Shire of Canning proposed the names "Burtsdale" and "Willetton" for Willetton and Lynwood/Parkwood respectively, the name Burtsdale honouring Septimus Burt, who purchased the land in 1882. In August 1965, developers at Lynwood requested the name "Clovercrest Estate", but finally agreed to "Lynwood". The name Willetton was shifted westwards and Lynwood was gazetted in December 1965.

Parkwood became its own suburb in 1993 and Lynwood still exist north of High Road.

Geography
Parkwood is bounded by High Road to the north and northeast, Nicholson Road to the east, Roe Highway to the south and Willeri Drive to the west.

Facilities 

Parkwood is a residential suburb with a scattering of parks of varying sizes. It contains Lynwood Senior High School (1974) and Parkwood Primary School (1975, originally called West Lynwood), which contains one of Perth's seven primary-school-level Intensive English Centres. The program is designed to assist refugees, displaced children and others with low English literacy, many of whom have special needs.

Stockland Riverton Shopping Centre, situated in Parkwood on the southern side of High Road, is near the Canning Arts Centre and the Riverton Leisureplex that are both situated in Riverton on the northern side of High Road. The Riverton Leisureplex is a large facility with sporting, fitness and recreation facilities first opened on 9 November 2001, is operated by the City of Canning and includes the council's largest library. The building was designed by the architectural firm James Christou and Partners.

The southeast is served by a neighbourhood shopping centre on Vellgrove Avenue and community and sports centre, which back onto Whaleback Golf Course, an 18-hole public golf course. The facility first opened on 9 January 1981 on a buffer reserve between the Canning Vale industrial area and the housing developments in Parkwood and Lynwood, and was significantly upgraded in December 2002.

References

External links

Suburbs of Perth, Western Australia
Suburbs in the City of Canning